Ready to Run may refer to: 

Ready to Run (film), 2000 Disney Channel television film
Ready to Run (album), 2003 debut and only album by Fame Academy contestant Sinéad Quinn and title song "Ready to Run" from the same album 
"Ready to Run" (song), a 1999 song by Dixie Chicks
"Ready to Run", a song by One Direction from the album Four
"Ready to Run", a 2019 song by Adam Lambert from his EP Velvet: Side A